Nicholas White (born 6 September 1997) is an Australian professional racing cyclist, who currently rides for UCI Continental team .

Major results

2015
 7th Road race, National Junior Road Championships
2017
 2nd Overall Tour of Gippsland
1st Stage 3
2018
 9th Overall Sri Lanka T-Cup
2019
 National Under-23 Road Championships
1st  Road race
4th Criterium
 1st Melbourne to Warrnambool Classic
 1st Stage 3 Tour de Taiwan
 6th Overall Tour of Southland
1st Stage 5
2020
 1st  Overall Tour de Taiwan
1st Stage 3
 3rd Criterium, National Road Championships
 3rd Overall Bay Cycling Classic
1st Stage 2
 10th Melbourne to Warrnambool Classic
2021
 4th Road race, National Road Championships

References

External links

1997 births
Living people
Australian male cyclists